The 1982 CRC Chemicals 300   was a motor race for Group C Touring Cars held at Amaroo Park Raceway in New South Wales, Australia on 8 August 1982.
It was staged over 155 laps, a total distance of 300.7 km (186.85 miles).
The race was organised by the Australian Racing Drivers Club.

The race was won by Alan Jones and Barry Jones driving a Mazda RX-7.

Results

Note
 Pole Position: Alan Jones (Mazda RX-7), 53.1s
 Entries: 35
 Starters: 21
 Finishers: 11
 Winners race time: 2 hr 28 min 22.9 sec

References

External links
 1982 CRC 300 Amaroo Park, www.youtube.com

Motorsport in Sydney
CRC Chemicals 300